Kepler-20g is a non-transiting exoplanet orbiting Kepler-20. Its radius is about twice that of Earth, with a minimum mass  Earth masses. Kepler-20g was announced on 24  August 2016. Existence of the planet was questioned in 2019.

References

Exoplanets discovered in 2016
Exoplanets detected by radial velocity
G

Lyra (constellation)